is a Japanese writer, journalist and politician from the Constitutional Democratic Party of Japan. He served two terms as a member of the House of Councillors after being elected in 2010 and in 2016 and serving as Chair of the Special Committee on Political Ethics and Election System, but lost his seat in 2022. Before he was elected, he was a regular commentator of Nippon Television's The Wide.

He is one of the most prominent anti-racism activists in Japan. He is also known for his investigations into religious groups such as Unification Church and Aum Shinri-kyo.

References

1952 births
Living people
People from Kyoto
Japanese writers
Japanese political journalists
Members of the House of Councillors (Japan)
Constitutional Democratic Party of Japan politicians
Democratic Party of Japan politicians
Anti-racism activists
Ritsumeikan University alumni